Kanu o ka ʻĀina New Century Public Charter School (KANU) is  Hawaii's first native designed and controlled public charter school. It is in Kamuela, Hawaii. KANUʻs founder is Dr. Kū Kahakalau.

It is a K-12 school.

References

External links
 Kanu O Ka Aina New Century Charter School

Charter schools in Hawaii
Public schools in Hawaii
Schools in Hawaii County, Hawaii
Public K-12 schools in Hawaii
Charter K-12 schools in the United States